Beshbuloq is an urban-type settlement in Dehqonobod District of Qashqadaryo Region in Uzbekistan. It was granted urban-type settlement status in 2009. Its population was 2,445 people in 2016.

References

Populated places in Qashqadaryo Region
Urban-type settlements in Uzbekistan